One Day Closer is the ninth studio album (eleventh overall) released by the singer-songwriter Jonathan Edwards. It contains many ballads and love songs.

Track listing 
  "Everything Takes Time" – 3:31 
  "Following My Heart" – 3:25 
  "One Day Closer" – 4:34  
  "This Island Earth" (Paul Cooper, Jonathan Edwards) – 3:18
  "Our First Kiss" – 3:04 
  "I Don't Know What Love Is" (Pierce Pettis, Jonathan Edwards) – 4:26
  "Lovers Like You and Me" – 4:07  
  "Margaret" (Frank Tedesso, Jonathan Edwards) – 5:22
  "I Know You" – 3:17 
  "This Old Guitar" – 4:04 
  "Chesapeake" – 5:25  
  "Sticks and Stones" – 4:00

1994 albums
Jonathan Edwards (musician) albums